Zone 79 is a zone of the municipality of Al Shamal in the state of Qatar. The main districts recorded in the 2015 population census were Madinat ash Shamal, the municipal seat, and Ar Ru'ays. 

Other districts which fall within its administrative boundaries are Al `Adhbah, Al Ghariyah, Al Khasooma, Al Mafjar, Al Qa`abiyah, Al Zeghab, and Ras Al Shindwie.

Demographics

Land use
The Ministry of Municipality and Environment (MME) breaks down land use in the zone as follows.

References 

Zones of Qatar
Al Shamal